Chike George Lindsay-Ajudua (born November 17, 1983) is an American Muay Thai kickboxer who competes in the Middleweight division. Lindsay is the former WKA North American Champion, WBC Muaythai International Champion, and IMTO Super Welterweight Champion.

Background
Lindsay began practicing martial arts at the age of 12, training in wushu as well as Brazilian jiu-jitsu and judo before settling on Muay Thai in 2003.

Career
Within five months, Lindsay won the USMTA Southeastern amateur welterweight title and he added the ISKA and WKA North American Championships as well as the Eastern US title to his mantelpiece over the next three years.

Lindsay turned professional in 2007, preferring to focus on the fighting hotbeds of Las Vegas and California due to the high level of competition. In his first title fight as a pro, he defeated Mukai Maromo by way of majority decision in Richmond, Virginia on September 29, 2007 to claim the WKA North American Super Welterweight (-70 kg/154.3 lb) Muay Thai strap. This win set him up for a fight against Matee "Dragon Leg" Jedeepatik, a star at Lumpinee Stadium during Muay Thai's golden age in the 1990s, for the International Muay Thai Organization World Super Welterweight Championship in Fresno, California on November 10, 2007. He dropped Matee twice with left hooks in the fifth round to secure the decision and take the world title.

On September 4, 2008, Lindsay stopped sanshou stylist Kang En with a body shot in round five in San Bernardino, California.

He suffered his first defeat to Baxter Humby by split decision in Las Vegas, Nevada on July 25, 2009. After rebounding with a majority decision victory over Chaz Mulkey a month later, Lindsay was given the chance to challenge Kevin Ross for his WBC Muaythai United States Welterweight (-66.678 kg/147 lb) strap in Primm, Nevada on December 5, 2009. He floored Ross in the final round but it was ruled a slip and he lost by split decision.

In 2010, Lindsay turned his hand to mixed martial arts. After taking a quick technical knockout win over Adam Brady in his MMA debut in Duluth, Georgia on May 15, 2010, he lost by submission due to an omoplata a minute into his sophomore fight with Joe Elmore in his native Atlanta, Georgia on December 4, 2010.

He was scheduled to make his return to Muay Thai at Bangkok Fight Night 10 in Atlanta on June 10, 2011 against Kenny Finister. However, Finister withdrew after sustaining a leg injury in training and the fight was scrapped. He instead made his comeback in a WBC Muaythai International Super Welterweight (-69.853 kg/154 lb) Championship match against Malaipet Sasiprapa at the M1 Grand Muay Thai Championship in Los Angeles, California on August 13, 2011. It was a close fight, but it was Lindsay's knees from the clinch that made the difference as he took the split decision.

In his first international fight, Lindsey was knocked down before being stopped with an uppercut from Wang Wei Hao in round two in Changsha, China on January 1, 2012. Returning to Atlanta, he was set to face Michael Corley at Bangkok Fight Night 12 on February 17, 2012. Corley pulled out due to other commitments, however, and was replaced by Eddie Martinez. Lindsay knocked Martinez out with an elbow in the second round to take the Bangkok Fight Club promotion's super welterweight belt. Fighting in Thailand for the first time, Lindsay lost on points against Suriya Prasathinphimai at an event marking Suk Wan Muaythai Naikhanomtom (National Muaythai Day) at CentralWorld in Bangkok on March 16, 2012.

A rematch between Chike Lindsay and Malaipet took place at Bangkok Fight Night: Undisputed in Atlanta on June 15, 2012 and Lindsay came out the victor once again by unanimous decision. With this win, he moved him up to the #1 spot in the North American super welterweight rankings. He then ended the year with two more unanimous decision wins over Cyrus Washington at Take-On Productions: Muay Thai at the Mecca 2 in New York City, New York on November 10 and Christophe Pruvost at Muay Thai in America: In Honor of the King in Los Angeles on December 1.

He took the biggest scalp of his career when he defeated Thai great Somrak Khamsing via unanimous decision in a three round bout at Push Kick Promotions: World Stand Off in Pomona, California on March 2, 2013. He then KO'd James Martinez with knees in round one at Bangkok Fight Night: Shockwave in Atlanta on April 5, 2013.

A fight with another of Thailand's best in Saiyok Pumpanmuang was scheduled for Muaythai Superfight in Bangkok on May 16, 2013 but was cancelled after the event was pushed back to June 14.

He fought Yodsanklai Fairtex for the inaugural Lion Fight Middleweight Championship at Lion Fight 10 in Las Vegas on July 26, 2013, losing a unanimous decision. Although Lindsay started well, he was unable to keep up when Yodsanklai switched tactics to stay closer (within clinch and elbow range) and suffered three cuts later in the bout.

He lost to Samy Sana on points in the quarter-finals of the 2013 edition of Thai Fight's -70 kg/154 lb tournament in Thailand on October 23, 2013.

Personal life
Chike Lindsay's on and off girlfriend and fellow kickboxer Adrienne Simmons died following a bout with Lindsay Scheer in Orlando, Florida in July 2010. She was knocked out in the third round of the fight, fell into a coma and died the following day. He has blamed Steve Fossum and the other organizers of the 2010 IKF World Classic event for not taking necessary safety precautions, stating that there was not an ambulance present at the event and that it took an hour to transport Simmons to a local hospital.

Championships and awards
 Bangkok Fight Club
 BFC Super Welterweight Championship
 International Muay Thai Organization
 IMTO World Super Welterweight Championship
 International Sport Karate Association
 ISKA Amateur North American Welterweight (-66.8 kg/147.3 lb) Muay Thai Championship
 United States Muay Thai Association
 USMTA Amateur Southeastern Welterweight Championship
 World Boxing Council Muaythai
 WBC Muaythai International Super Welterweight (-69.853 kg/154 lb) Championship
 World Kickboxing Association
 WKA Amateur Eastern Welterweight (-67 kg/147.7 lb) Muay Thai Championship
 WKA Amateur North American Welterweight (-67 kg/147.7 lb) Muay Thai Championship
 WKA North American Super Welterweight (-70 kg/154.3 lb) Muay Thai Championship

Kickboxing record

Legend:

Mixed martial arts record

Legend:

References

External links
 Official site
 Push Kick Promotions profile
 

1983 births
Living people
American male kickboxers
Kickboxers from Georgia (U.S. state)
Welterweight kickboxers
Middleweight kickboxers
American male mixed martial artists
Mixed martial artists from Georgia (U.S. state)
Lightweight mixed martial artists
Mixed martial artists utilizing kickboxing
Mixed martial artists utilizing Muay Thai
Mixed martial artists utilizing wushu
Mixed martial artists utilizing judo
Mixed martial artists utilizing Brazilian jiu-jitsu
American Muay Thai practitioners
American wushu practitioners
American male judoka
American practitioners of Brazilian jiu-jitsu
Sportspeople from Atlanta
African-American sportsmen
American sportspeople of Nigerian descent
21st-century African-American sportspeople
20th-century African-American people